The Gulf Centre for Human Rights (GCHR) is an independent non-profit charity that defends human rights in the Persian Gulf and neighbouring states that include, Saudi Arabia, Bahrain, Yemen, UAE, Oman, Iran, Qatar, Syria, Iraq, Jordan, Kuwait, and Lebanon.

The GCHR is funded by the Sigrid Rausing Trust. Its vision is "To develop and protect a sustainable network of human rights defenders in the Gulf region." They are based in Lebanon.

The organisation was co-founded by Khalid Ibrahim along with Abdulhadi Al-Khawaja and Nabeel Rajab, Bahraini activists who have both been jailed in Bahrain. Bahraini activist Maryam Al-Khawaja is a co-director of the organisation.

In June 2021, the organisation filled a complaint in France against UAE's official candidate for Interpol's presidency, Ahmed Naser Al-Raisi. The organisation accuses him of being responsible for “torture and barbaric acts” against UAE dissident Ahmed Mansoor.

Activities and Campaigns 
In its 24th periodic report on human rights violations in Iraq, GCHR has documented the demonstrations and counter-demonstrations taking place in the country. Released on 8 August 2022, the report covers the violations that have affected citizens, including human rights activists, journalists, and media professionals. GCHR explains that children in Iraq are also subjected to numerous violations, including death and human trafficking. Among other recommendations, it urges the new Iraqi Council of Representatives to legislate the Law on the Protection of Journalists and the Law on the Protection of the Child.

On 5 August 2022, GCHR expressed its concern over the safety of four journalists facing death sentence in Yemen. GCHR demanded the immediate release of the journalists named Abdulkhaleq Ahmed Amran, Akram Saleh Al-Walidi, Al-Hareth Saleh Hamid, and Tawfiq Mohammed Al-Mansouri.

On 16 August 2022, GCHR called for the immediate release of a journalist Younis Abdulsalam Ahmed Abdulrahman who was detained over a year ago in Yemen.

References 

Human rights organizations
International nongovernmental organizations
Human rights organisations based in Lebanon
Non-profit organisations based in Lebanon